Marcel Auguste André Baril (13 November 1905 – 29 January 1979) was a French weightlifter. He competed in the men's featherweight event at the 1936 Summer Olympics.

References

1905 births
1979 deaths
French male weightlifters
Olympic weightlifters of France
Weightlifters at the 1936 Summer Olympics
20th-century French people